Nell is a traditional nickname for Eleanor. Nell is the name of:

People

Given name
 Nell (artist) (born 1975), Australian artist
 Nell Blaine (1922–1996), American painter
 Nell Bryden (born 1977), American singer
 Nell Carter (1948–2003), American singer and actress
 Nell Dunn (born 1936), English playwright, screenwriter, and author
 Nell Fortner (born 1959), American women's college basketball coach
 Nell Freudenberger (born 1975), American novelist
 Nell Gwyn (1650–1687), mistress of King Charles II of England
 Nell McAndrew (born 1973), English glamour model
 Nell McCafferty (born 1944), Irish journalist, playwright, civil rights campaigner, and feminist
 Nell O'Day (1909–1989), American equestrian and actress
 Nell Rankin (1924–2005), American opera singer
 Nell Scott, American politician
 Nell Sinton (1910–1997), American painter
 Nell Shipman (1892–1970), Canadian actress and screenwriter
 Nell Sigland, Norwegian heavy metal singer

Surname                                                                                          
                                                                                                             
 Cristal Nell (1978–2020), American bridge player
 Jeremy Nell (born 1979), South African cartoonist and blogger
 William Cooper Nell (1816–1874), American abolitionist and author

Fictional characters
 Nell Fenwick, from the "Dudley Do-Right" segments of The Rocky and Bullwinkle Show TV series
 Nell Mangel, from the Australian soap opera Neighbours
 Nell Trent, or Little Nell, heroine of Charles Dickens' The Old Curiosity Shop
 Nell the kitchen wench, in Shakespeare's play Comedy of Errors
 Nell, short for Nellodee, the protagonist in Neal Stephenson's The Diamond Age
 Nell Jones, a special agent from the TV series NCIS: Los Angeles
 Nell Kellty, the protagonist in the play Idioglossia by Mark Handley and Jodie Foster's film adaptation Nell

See also
 Nella
 Nelly (given name)

Feminine given names
Hypocorisms